Lorenzo "Chuck" Reed (born December 21, 1970) was an American football offensive lineman who last played the San Jose SaberCats of the Arena Football League (AFL). Prior to joining the SaberCats, he played for the Shreveport Pirates of the Canadian Football League and the Anaheim Piranhas, Portland Forest Dragons, and Oklahoma Wranglers of the AFL. Prior to playing professionally, Reed played collegiate football at UNLV.

Reed joined the SaberCats in 2002. He played mainly as an offensive lineman, though he also saw significant amount of playing time on the team's defensive line. He played in (and won) two ArenaBowls with the SaberCats in 2002 and 2004, respectively. Reed's active playing career ended following the SaberCats' 2005 campaign; he remained, however, on the team's injured reserve through 2007. He won his third (and final) championship that year when the SaberCats defeated the Columbus Destroyers in ArenaBowl XXI.

References

1970 births
Living people
American football offensive linemen
Canadian football offensive linemen
African-American players of American football
African-American players of Canadian football
UNLV Rebels football players
Shreveport Pirates players
Anaheim Piranhas players
Portland Forest Dragons players
Oklahoma Wranglers players
San Jose SaberCats players
Players of American football from Shreveport, Louisiana
21st-century African-American sportspeople
20th-century African-American sportspeople